The Old Palace, also referred to as the Archbishop's Palace, is a historic building situated within the precincts of Canterbury Cathedral. It is the main residence of the Archbishop of Canterbury when in Canterbury.

Background
Built within the grounds of the Cathedral, probably by Lanfranc in the 11th century, the Old Palace was the residence of the Archbishop when he visited Canterbury. The palace was rebuilt between 1193 and 1228. The Great Hall, the second largest medieval great hall in Britain after Westminster Hall, was constructed c 1200-1220 by Archbishops Hubert Walter and Stephen Langton and demolished in the 1650s. In 1982, a large trench was excavated on the site of the Great Hall.

In 1647, during the English Civil War, the palace was taken over by Parliament along with its estates. Most of the major buildings of the Palace were demolished in the 1650s. It stayed empty until the 19th century.

Restoration

In 1896, the Old Palace was restored by W. D. Caröe.  Archbishop Frederick Temple was the first archbishop to live there since 1647. A curved building with two to three floors, it incorporates the west end of the undercroft of the monastic  refectory. The south wing contains some traces of old work in the buttresses and a 14th-century two-light window. A 16th-century gateway remains but is now blocked.

It has undergone many modifications and adjustments over the years, and reopened in 2006 after a two-year refurbishment.

Current use
In addition to being the official residence of the Archbishop when in Canterbury, part of the building is also the home of the Bishop of Dover who is a suffragan bishop in the Diocese of Canterbury.

Status
The palace became a Grade I listed building on 3 May 1967.

See also
 Grade I listed buildings in City of Canterbury

References

External links 

 Geographic coordinates: 

Buildings and structures in Canterbury
Grade I listed houses in Kent
Episcopal palaces of archbishops of Canterbury
Clergy houses in England
Buildings by W. D. Caröe